Deniz Celiloğlu (born 1 January 1986) is a Turkish television and film actor.

Deniz Celiloğlu was born on 1 January 1986 in Bulgaria and moved with his family to Turkey at the age of 3. A graduate of Mimar Sinan University, Faculty of State Conservatory, Theater Department, Deniz Celiloğlu took part in many plays. He became known for his role as Commissioner Selim in the Kanal D series Kanıt. He also had leading roles in the movies Ev and Tamam mıyız?. Deniz Celiloğlu married Müge Bayramoğlu on 12 December 2010. The couple divorced after 3 years of marriage on 27 December 2013 at the Istanbul Family Court.

Filmography

References

External links 
 

Turkish male film actors
Turkish male television actors
Turkish male stage actors
Mimar Sinan Fine Arts University alumni
Bulgarian Turks in Turkey
Living people
1986 births